Alathur Brothers   Srinivasa Iyer (1911–1980) & Sivasubramania Iyer (1916–1965) were Carnatic vocalists. The world of Carnatic music knows them as the star duo of the twentieth century. 
They learnt under Alathur Venkatesa Iyer, the father of Sivasubramania Iyer.  They were not brothers by birth but were rather bound by the brotherhood of music. Srinivasa Iyer was born to Angarai Sankara Sroudigal and Lakshmi Ammal at Ariyalur village as one of 12 siblings. 

They gave their first concert at Thyagaraja Aradhana festival in Thiruvaiyaru in 1928. Following the grand tradition set by their guru, the duo excelled in the authentic version of Carnatic music bringing together its technicalities to develop a taste for this patantara in the audience, both the experts and the laymen, alike.

Combining the strengths of various aspects of Carnatic music, they established a style of music for themselves. Their music was the result of arduous training, conscious evolution of the Lakshya and Lakshana aspects, unique to Carnatic music and inspiration drawn from many a colossus of bygone era in Carnatic music. Known to the world to have presented many a complicate "pallavi" replete with all its mathematical permutations and combinations of usages, they had mastered "Laya" at a young age, imbibing the art from their Guru. Not many know though that another stalwart of Carnatic music, Semmangudi Srinivasa Iyer had once commented that the kind of "Jeevan" or life the brothers enthused in the very same compositions others sang on the concert platform was hard to enunciate and almost incomparable.

The finesse and authority with which they handled compositions like Vidulaku Mrokeda (Mayamalavagowla, Tyagaraja), Mari Mari Ninne (Kambhoji, Tyagaraja), Epapamu (Atana, Tyagaraja), Shantamu Lekha (Sama, Tyagaraja), Kalinarula (Kuntalavarali, Tyagaraja), Koniyadina (Kambhoji, Veena Kuppaiyer), Shree Matha Shiva (Begada, Muthuswami Dikshitar), Kanulara Kanti (Danyasi, Wallajahpet Venkatramana Bhagavatar) were essays into the very depths of the most authentic of Carnatic music.

Compositions in Tamil like Sivanai Ninaindhavar (Hindolam, Kavikunjara Bharathi) sparkled in their exposition. Exclusive Tiruppugazh concerts were a regular with them.

The Alathur brothers performed with most of the star accompanists of the world of Carnatic music. On the violin, earlier they were accompanied by Thiruvalangadu Sundaresa Iyer, Mayavaram V. R. Govindaraja Pillai, Kumbakonam Rajamanickam Pillai, Mysore T. Chowdiah among others. Later T. N. Krishnan and Lalgudi G. Jayaraman accompanied them in most of their concerts while Kandadevi Azhagirisami accompanied them in a few.

In the earliest of their concerts, mostly in and around Tiruchirapalli, the veteran mridangam exponent, Pudukottai Dakshinamoorthy Pillai accompanied them. It was he who introduced Pazhani Subramania Pillai, son of Pazhani Muthiah Pillai, himself a close friend of Alathur Venkatesa Iyer, to them. Their regular concerts in Tanjore and later in Madras had brought to them the Mridangam maestro Palghat Mani Iyer. From then onwards their concerts were either with Pazhani Subramania Pillai on the mridangam or an incomparable combination of Mani Iyer on the mridangam and Pillai on the Kanjira. It is said that the brothers were at their peak form essaying mind-boggling Pallavis with Lalgudi Jayaraman on the violin to provide answer to their exulting calculations and Mani Iyer and Pillai to take it further on to a different plane altogether with their solo versions, Thaniavardhanam.

From 1944 to 1968 the brothers were the court musicians for the Maharajah of Travancore. They were awarded the prestigious Sangeetha Kalanidhi award in two consecutive years, 1964 and 1965.

References

External links
Alathur Brothers
Alathur Brothers
Alathur Brothers
The Hindu
few samples here available soures:musicindiaonline.com
The Alathur Brothers
Brothers of music, biographical sketch of the Alathur Brothers

Male Carnatic singers
Carnatic singers